Thomas Böhm (born 23 November 1965) is an Austrian swimmer. He competed at the 1984 Summer Olympics and the 1988 Summer Olympics.

References

1965 births
Living people
Austrian male swimmers
Olympic swimmers of Austria
Swimmers at the 1984 Summer Olympics
Swimmers at the 1988 Summer Olympics
Place of birth missing (living people)